The 2001 Virginia 500 was the eighth stock car race of the 2001 NASCAR Winston Cup Series and the 52nd iteration of the event. The race was held on Sunday, April 8, 2001, Martinsville, Virginia at Martinsville Speedway, a  permanent oval-shaped short track. The race took the scheduled 500 laps to complete. Within the final laps of the race, Robert Yates Racing driver Dale Jarrett would manage to pass teammate Ricky Rudd to earn his 27th career NASCAR Winston Cup Series victory and his third victory of the season. To fill out the top three, Rudd and Roush Racing driver Jeff Burton would finish second and third, respectively.

Background 

Martinsville Speedway is an NASCAR-owned stock car racing track located in Henry County, in Ridgeway, Virginia, just to the south of Martinsville. At 0.526 miles (0.847 km) in length, it is the shortest track in the NASCAR Cup Series. The track was also one of the first paved oval tracks in NASCAR, being built in 1947 by H. Clay Earles. It is also the only remaining race track that has been on the NASCAR circuit from its beginning in 1948.

Entry list 

 (R) denotes rookie driver.

Practice

First practice 
The first practice session was held on Friday, April 6, at 11:15 AM EST. The session would last for one hour and 10 minutes.

Final practice 
he final practice session, sometimes referred to as Happy Hour, was held on Saturday, April 7, at 11:30 EST. The session would last for one hour and 30 minutes.

Qualifying 
Qualifying was held on Friday, April 6, at 3:00 PM EST. Each driver would have two laps to set a fastest time; the fastest of the two would count as their official qualifying lap. Positions 1-36 would be decided on time, while positions 37-43 would be based on provisionals. Six spots are awarded by the use of provisionals based on owner's points. The seventh is awarded to a past champion who has not otherwise qualified for the race. If no past champ needs the provisional, the next team in the owner points will be awarded a provisional.

Three drivers would fail to qualify: Jason Leffler, Hermie Sadler, and Hut Stricklin.

Full qualifying results

Race results

References 

2001 NASCAR Winston Cup Series
NASCAR races at Martinsville Speedway
April 2001 sports events in the United States
2001 in sports in Virginia